Tavaris Tate (born December 21, 1990) is an American sprinter.

Career

At the 2009 Pan American Junior Athletics Championships, Tate won a silver medal in the 400 m and a gold medal in the 4x400 m relay along with Clayton Parros, Duane Walker, and Joey Hughes.

At the 2010 IAAF World Indoor Championships, Tate won a gold medal in the 4x400 m relay along with Jamaal Torrance, Greg Nixon, and Bershawn Jackson.

Personal bests

Last updated July 11, 2010.

References

External links
 
DyeStat profile for Tavaris Tate

1990 births
American male sprinters
Living people
World Athletics Indoor Championships winners